The 1983–84 DDR-Oberliga was the 35th season of the DDR-Oberliga, the first tier of league football in East Germany.

The league was contested by fourteen teams. BFC Dynamo won the championship, the club's sixth of ten consecutive East German championships from 1978 to 1988, thereby equalling the record held by Dynamo Dresden and FC Vorwärts Berlin.

Rainer Ernst of BFC Dynamo was the league's top scorer with 20 goals, while Hans-Jürgen Dörner of Dynamo Dresden took out the seasons East German Footballer of the year award.

On the strength of the 1983–84 title BFC Dynamo qualified for the 1984–85 European Cup where the club was knocked out by FK Austria Wien in the second round. Second-placed club Dynamo Dresden qualified for the 1984–85 European Cup Winners' Cup as the seasons FDGB-Pokal winners and lost to SK Rapid Wien in the quarter finals. Third-placed 1. FC Lokomotive Leipzig qualified for the 1984–85 UEFA Cup where it was knocked out by FC Spartak Moscow in the second round while fourth-placed FC Vorwärts Frankfurt lost to PSV Eindhoven in the first round.

Table									
The 1983–84 season saw two newly promoted clubs, Stahl Riesa and BSG Chemie Leipzig.

 Relegation playoff: 1.FC Union Berlin - BSG Chemie Leipzig 1–1 & 1–2

Results

References

Sources

External links
 Das Deutsche Fussball Archiv  Historic German league tables

1983–84 in German football leagues
1983-84
1